The 1934–35 Challenge Cup was the 35th staging of rugby league's oldest knockout competition, the Challenge Cup.

First round

Second round

Quarterfinals

Semifinals

Final
Castleford beat Huddersfield 11-8 in the final at Wembley before a crowd of 39,000.  This was Castleford’s first Challenge Cup final win in their first final appearance.

This was Huddersfield’s first defeat in six Final’s appearances.

References

Challenge Cup
Challenge Cup